The Luncavăț (in its upper course also: Curpeni) is a right tributary of the river Olt in Romania. It discharges into the Olt near Marcea. Its source is in the Căpățânii Mountains.

References

Rivers of Romania
Rivers of Vâlcea County